Oklip is a village in Oklip district, Pegunungan Bintang Regency in Highland Papua province, Indonesia. Its population is 201.

Climate
Oklip has a very wet Subtropical highland climate (Cfb) with very heavy rainfall year-round.

References

Villages in Highland Papua